Palpada suprarufa is a species of flower flies first found in Ecuador. It is named suprarufa, based on the appearance of the species (Latin for “above red”).

Description
Its face is brownish yellow; gena is brownish black; lunule is large, shiny and orange; its frontal triangle is brownish yellow. Its eye is densely brownish, while its antenna is orange.

The thorax is mainly black; postpronotum orange; scutum black; scutellum is reddish orange; pleura black. Its calypter is brownish black and the plumula brownish orange.

Its wings are hyaline and bare; tegula and basicosta are black. The coxae and trochanters are black; femora are black except the apices which are narrowly orange; protibiae are black, mesotibia brownish orange, metatibia flattened, broad and black. The tarsi are orange.

The abdomen's dorsum is mainly reddish orange, black only on the 1st, narrowly basomedially and medially on  the 2nd and with a black triangular basomedial macula on the 3rd tergum, which is reddish. The sterna are brownish black.

The male genitalia are shiny black. The female is similar to the male except for normal sexual dimorphism and its front being orange, while its 5th tergum is black.

References

External links

ADW entry

Diptera of South America
Insects described in 1999
Eristalinae
Taxa named by F. Christian Thompson